Arteshbod Gholam-Ali Oveissi (‎; 16 April 1918 – 7 February 1984) was an Iranian general and the Chief Commander of the Imperial Iranian Armed Forces under Mohammad Reza Pahlavi. He was the last general to head the Imperial Army of Iran. He is regarded as one of the most powerful and adept military generals in Iran's modern history.

Early life
Oveissi's family from his father's lineage goes back to Shah Qara Yusuf Muhammad, the ruler of the Ghara Ghoyonlu dynasty (Black Sheep Turkomans) and descends through Uzun Hassan. He is a direct descendant of Eskandar Beik Torkaman, the minister, head of army (Iraq campaign) and personal advisor to Shah Abbas the Great. On his mother's side he was the grandson of Hossein Ali Mirza, the eldest son of Mohammad Ali Shah Qajar. In 1937, Oveissi married Sharafat Baniadam, the daughter of Sharif Doleh Baniadam, and granddaughter of Sharif Doleh Bozorg. They were married until her passing in 1972. The Baniadams were members of the Ghaffari family of Kashan.

Education and career
Oveissi received his diploma from Iran's Military High School. He attended the Officers Faculty in the same class as Mohammad Reza Pahlavi continuing his military training in the Military Academy in Tehran where he graduated first in his class. The top graduates of the class were selected by Reza Shah to go straight to the Imperial Guard, an honor given only to the top five graduates. Oveissi sought permission from Reza Shah to be stationed at Khuzestan instead where the government was involved in battle with rebel groups. He attended the Military organization in Fort Myers, Virginia and Fort Leavenworth (Kansas) in 1959.

 From 1938–1939 he was chosen to command the Military Section of the 7th and 13th regiments positioned in Fars Province and replaced the commander of the 6th regiment from 1940–1941. 
 From 1941–1943 he replaced the military commander of Fars Province, section 13.
 From 1940–1960 he was chief of the military faculty in Tehran.

After 1955 his military career progressed rapidly.
 On 12 September 1954, he became a full colonel and served with that rank until 1960 when he was promoted to general in the Imperial Iranian Army.
 From 1958–1960 he participated actively in the military court prosecution of communist officers.
 He continued his military studies in the United States periodically from 1960–1965, and became a full commander of the Royal Military division of the Imperial Guards.

Four Star General of the Army. From 1960–1965 Oveissi became a four star general of the Army, being the youngest of his peers to achieve the rank of four stars.
 In 1965 General Oveissi became the Chief Commander of the security divisions of the Policy Academy.
 In 1966 he served in the Committee of Information of the Imperial Iranian Army.
 In 1969 he obtained the highest military rank.

In addition, Oveissi served as the military governor of Tehran.

Medals
General Oveissi received many military medals for his honorable and distinguished services in the Iranian Armed Forces, including:

1) Medals 1, 2, and 3 for his aptitude;

2) Medal of Honor 1, 2, and 3;

3) He was honored with a medal (level 2) for his exceptional effort in the counter coup d'état of 1953 (28 Mordad);  

4) He received a medal for being a master marksman;

4) He received the medal of (Taj) crown level 3 Medal of Homayoun level 3;

5) Medal of appreciation and acknowledgement levels 1 and 2;

6) Medal for his tireless efforts and highly praised work levels 1, 2, and 3;
 
7) Medal for his services level 3;

8) Medal for his distinguished education.

Oveissi additionally obtained medals from various countries' military organizations. He received medals from Italian, English, Lebanese, German, and Ethiopian militaries as well.

Personal life
Oveissi married twice. His first wife was Sherafat Oveissi with whom he had three children. She died of cancer in 1971. Oveissi married again in 1973.General Oveissi married Sharareh Oveissi with whom he had two children.

Later years and assassination
In January 1979, Oveissi was pressured to resign and leave the country. He settled in France just before the Iranian revolution on 11 February. In the immediate aftermath of the revolution, Ayatollah Sadegh Khalkhali, a religious judge and then chairman of the Islamic Revolutionary Court, informed the press that the death sentence was passed on the members of the Pahlavi family and former Shah officials, including Oveissi.

Oveissi was shot dead, along with his brother, Gholam Hossein, on 7 February 1984 in Paris, Rue de Passy. Oveissi was 66 years old. The Islamic Jihad Organization claimed responsibility for the assassination. His death was considered by many as the blow that dealt the most setback to opposition groups poised to overthrow the revolutionary regime in Tehran. Two days before his assassination he was expected to fly back to the border of Iran to lead a counter revolutionary army of officers and men from elite divisions of the late Shah's military that was quartered in 22 makeshift barracks in eight Turkish villages and at five clandestine bases inside Iran.  Since Oveissi had strong ties and the support of powerful members of the clergy including Grand Ayatollahs Mohammad Kazem Shariatmadari and Abu al-Qasim al-Khoei his elimination was priority number one for the newly established revolutionary government.

References

External links
 

20th-century Iranian people
Assassinated military personnel
1918 births
1984 deaths
Exiles of the Iranian Revolution in France
Iranian emigrants to France
Imperial Iranian Armed Forces four-star generals
Iranian people murdered abroad
People from Qom
People murdered in Paris
People sentenced to death in absentia
Terrorism deaths in France 
1984 murders in France
1980s murders in Paris